Hansnes is the administrative centre of Karlsøy Municipality in Troms og Finnmark county, Norway. The village is located on the northeast side of the island of Ringvassøya, along the Langsundet strait. The Langsund Tunnel is a proposed undersea tunnel  which will connect the islands of Ringvassøya and Reinøya. When built, the tunnel will replace the ferry service from Hansnes to the nearby islands of Karlsøya, Vannøya, and Reinøya.

Hansnes is home to stores, a gas station, a bank, a café, a medical center, Ringvassøy Church, a school, a day care, and nursing homes.

References

Villages in Troms
Karlsøy

It is possible that the village was given its name when Hans Mortensen Hegeland when he moved the family farm from Elvevoll approximately 1672